Portuguese Rhapsody is a 1959 Portuguese documentary film directed by João Mendes. It was entered into the 1959 Cannes Film Festival.

References

External links

1959 films
1950s Portuguese-language films
Portuguese documentary films
Films directed by João Mendes
1959 documentary films